The District of California was a Union Army command department formed during the American Civil War.  The district was part of the Department of the Pacific, the commander of the department also being District commander.  The district was created as a separate command on July 1, 1864, after Irvin McDowell took command of the Department of the Pacific, relieving General Wright, who then remained as District of California commander.  The District comprised the state of California and the areas of the Rogue River and Umpqua River in Southern Oregon. Its headquarters were in San Francisco, co-located with those of the Department of the Pacific. On March 14, 1865, the District of Oregon was extended to include the entire state of Oregon, removing the Rogue River and Umpqua River areas from the District.

District of California commanders 
Albert Sidney Johnston, January 1861 - March 1861
Edwin Vose Sumner, March 1861 - October 1861
George Wright, October 1861 - June 27, 1865 
 
On July 27, 1865, the Military Division of the Pacific was created under Major General Henry W. Halleck, replacing the Department of the Pacific. It consisted of the Department of the Columbia replacing the District of Oregon and the Department of California. George Wright, now a U. S. Army Brigadier General, was assigned to command the new Department of the Columbia.

Oregon posts in the District of California 1861-1865 
 Fort Umpqua, 1856–1862
 Camp Baker, 1862-1865 
Fort Klamath 1863-1865 -source is Official Records of the War of the Rebellion, v. 50, pt. 2 semi annual returns beginning December 1863.

Posts in the District of California 

 Benicia Arsenal, 1851–1964
 Benicia Barracks, 1852–1866
 Fort Jones, 1852–1858, 1864 
 Post of Alcatraz Island or Fort Alcatraz, 1853–1907
 Roop's Fort, Fort Defiance, Susanville 1853-1863 
 Fort Point San José, San Francisco, 1853–1882
 Fort Point, San Francisco, 1853–1886
 Fort Crook 1857-1869 
 Camp Allen, Oakland 1860-? 
 Camp Cady, 20 miles east of Barstow 1860, 1862, 1864 - 1871 
 Camp Dragoon Bridge, south of the town of Litchfield 1860-1863 
 Camp Downey, Oakland, 1861 
 Camp Halleck, Stockton, 1861-1863 
 Camp Fitzgerald, Los Angeles  June 1861 - September 20, 1861  
 Fort on Pine Creek, Independence 1861-1865
 Camp San Bernardino, San Bernardino 1861 
 Camp Lyon, San Francisco 1861-1865 
 Mare Island Post, 1861–1862
 Camp McClellan, Auburn 1861 
 Camp McDougall, near Stockton, 1861
 Camp Gilmore, 1863 
 Camp Union, Sutterville 1861-1866 
 Camp Sigel, near Auburn, 1861–1862 
 Camp Sumner, San Francisco, 1861-1865 
 Camp Wright, San Francisco, 1861
 Camp Alert, San Francisco, 1862-1865 
 Camp Hot Creek Station, 1862 
 Camp Hooker, near Stockton, 1862 
 Camp at Red Bluff, Red Bluff, 1862  
 Camp Reynolds on Angel Island, 1863–1866
 Camp Bidwell, Chico, 1863–1865
 Camp Chico, Chico, 1865
 Camp Merchant (originally Camp Merritt), 1863  
 Fort Miller, 1863–1864.
 Camp Stanford, Stockton, 1863 
 Camp Johns, 1864 
 Camp Low, 1864-1865  
 Camp Pollock 1864 
 Camp Susan, Susanville 1864 
 Federal Armory, Copperopolis 1864-1875 
 Post at Friday's Station, 1864 
 Colusa Post, 1864-1865 
 Camp Bidwell 1865-1879 (Later Fort Bidwell)
 Camp near Hornitos, 18 miles northeast of Merced, 1865 
 Camp Jackson, near Ione, 1865 
 Monterey Barracks, 1865-1866 
 Camp at Pierson's Ranch, 1865 
 Camp Waite, 1865-1866

Events, skirmishes, and battles 
1861
 January 15, 1861. The Departments of California and Oregon merged into the Department of the Pacific.  Col. Albert Sidney Johnston, 2nd US Cavalry, Brevet Brigadier General, U. S. Army, assumes command of the Department of the Pacific (including direct command of the District of California).
 March 23, 1861. Brigadier General Edwin V. Sumner, U. S. Army, assigned to command the Department of the Pacific.
 April 25, 1861. Brig. Gen. Edwin V. Sumner, U. S. Army, assumes command of tho Department of the Pacific, relieving Col. Albert Sidney Johnston, 2nd US Cavalry, brevet brigadier-general, U. S. Army.
 August 3–12, 1861. Scout from Fort Crook to Round Valley, California, with skirmish on the 6th in the Upper Pitt River Valley.
 August 15–22, 1861. Expedition from Fort Crook to tho Pitt River, California, with skirmish on the 19th near Kellogg's Lake, California.
 Sept. 7,1861. Skirmish near the Santa Ana Canyon, California.
 Sept. 14, 1861. Col. George Wright, 9th US Infantry, assigned to command all troops serving in Southern California.
 Sept. 25, 1861. The District of Southern California created, comprising the counties of San Luis Obispo, Tulare, Santa Barbara, Los Angeles, San Bernardino, and San Diego, and Col. George Wright, assigned to its command.
 Oct. 11, 1861. Lieut. Col. Albemarle Cady, 7th US Infantry, assigned to command the District of Oregon.
 Oct. 20,1861. Brig. Gen. Edwin V. Sumner, U. S. Army, relinquishes command of the Department of the Pacific to Col. George Wright.
 Oct. 26,1861. Col. George Wright, assumes command of tho Department of the Pacific.
 Nov. 19,1861. Brig. Gen. George Wright, U. S. Army, formally assigned to command the Department of the Pacific.
 Dec. 12, 1861. Humboldt Military District created to prosecute the Bald Hills War, to consist of the counties of Sonoma, Napa, Mendocino, Trinity, Humboldt, Klamath, and Del Norte, in Northern California, and Col. Francis J. Lippitt, Second California Infantry, assigned to its command.

1862
 Sept. 21,1862.  Affair on the Yreka Road, near Fort Crook, Cal.
 Nov. 3-29, 1862.  Scouts from Fort Crook, Cal., and Fort Churchill, Nev. Ter., to Honey Lake Valley, Cal.

1863

1864
  July 1, 1864.  Brig. Gen. George Wright, U. S. Army, retained command of the District of California but Maj. Gen. Irvin McDowell, U. S. Army, relieved him and assumed command of the Department of tho Pacific.

1865
  Apr. 5–18, 1865.  Expedition from Camp Bidwell to Antelope Creek, Cal.
  June 27, 1865.  Military Division of the Pacific created, to consist of the Departments of California and the Columbia.  Department of California consisted of the States of California and Nevada and the Territories of New Mexico and Arizona.  Maj. Gen. Irvin McDowell, U. S. Army, assigned to command the Department of California.

See also
California in the American Civil War

References

California
California, District of
Pacific Coast Theater of the American Civil War
California in the American Civil War
Oregon in the American Civil War
1864 establishments in California